The Player Draft for the 2nd season of the Pakistan Super League was held at Dubai on 19 October 2016. A total of 414 players, including Pakistani and foreign cricketers, were divided into five different categories: Platinum, Diamond, Gold, Silver and Emerging. The salary-spending cap for a franchise was US$1.2 million, including the signing of players, coaches and support staff. Each team was allowed to pick eight foreign and 12 domestic players in a squad of up to 20.

Player contracts and salaries 
Each player who participates in the PSL is categorized in a group according to their "value", from Platinum class players at the top end through to Emerging class players at the bottom. Salaries in the league are generally determined by the category the player falls into. During the 2017 Pakistan Super League Platinum class players will earn a base salary of US$140,000, Diamond class players US$70,000, Gold class players $50,000, Silver class $25,000 and Emerging players $10,000.

Supplementary players are picked by teams but are not paid unless they join the squad for the tournament at which point their contracts will commence. For Supplementary players there is no contractual base salary.

Transfers 
The Pakistan Super League player transfer window was between 15 July and 15 September 2016. The following transfers took place.

Retained Players 
Following is the list of players retained by their franchises from previous season.

New Picks 
Following is the list of players picked by different teams.

Players per country 

The number of players who appeared in the draft from each country is as follows:

Replacements

References

2017 in Pakistani cricket
Pakistan Super League player drafts
2017 Pakistan Super League